Anton Hofer (1927–2009) was an Austrian politician and trade unionist. He was born in Lichtenwörth, Austria, on June 1, 1927, and died in Vienna on February 14, 2009.

Life 
Anton Hofer learned after his school time, during World War II, the profession of an aircraft constructor and pilot. After the war and Russian war captivity, he changed to the oil industries - a forerunner model of the OMV AG - as a design draughtsman and blast engineer. Within a few months, he became head of the plant security. In his spare time, he found a new interest: volleyball. A major attendance in the Austrian volleyball team underlines his ability in the 1950s.

In 1955, he changed from the oil industries to politics and found his mission within the field of Austrian social policy. In this time he studied philosophy and history. In 1964 he was elected to the Austrian Chamber of Labour and did this job till the late 1980s. In 1970 he became head of the Gewerkschaftlichen Linksblock - a labour union within the Austrian Trade Union Federation and was a member of the Austrian Trade Union Federation Executive Board. Between 1970 and 1990, he was part of the council of the World Federation of Trade Unions.
In 1990 he retired, and left politics.

References
 Matzner Förderpost, Gewerkschaftlicher Linksblock, Gänserndorf (later Vienna from 1958 to 1990).
 Die Arbeit, Leopold Horak (Vienna from 1968 to 1976).
 Wehrt Euch gegen den Lohnsteuerraub, GLOBUS Verlag, Vienna 1972.
 Betriebsterror – konkret, Gewerkschaftlicher Linksblock, Vienna 1977.
 Gegen Sozialstopp und Sozialabbau, GLOBUS Verlag, Vienna 1978.
 Stationen meines Lebens, Vienna 2003.

External links
 Österreichische Nationalbibliothek

1927 births
2009 deaths
Austrian politicians
Austrian trade union leaders